Philippe Poitevin (21 January 1831 in Saint-Maximin-la-Sainte-Baume15 September 1907 in Marseille) was a French sculptor.

Biography
Philippe Poitevin was a student of Joseph-Marius Ramus and Armand Toussaint. He began at the Salon of 1855 and produced mainly busts. 

In 1854, he was hired to restore the friezes of the Palais des Tuileries in Paris. In 1856, he was hired to make 85 stone sculptures for the Lesdiguières Pavilion in the Louvre Palace. After a ten-year stay in Paris, he settled in Marseille.

He worked for the Palais Longchamp in Marseille where, in the main staircase of the Museum of Fine Arts, he produced two groups of two children carrying cartridges on which are engraved the names of artists Finssonius (Louis Finson) and Dandré-Bardon (Michel-François Dandré-Bardon), as well as four bronze medallions, on either side of the museum entrance doors, representing Georges Cuvier and Aristotle for the door of the natural history museum, Nicolas Poussin and Pierre Puget for that of the museum the fine Arts. 

For the Longchamp Palace nymphaeum, he produced the bust of Maximin-Dominique Consolat which faces that of the engineer Jean François Mayor de Montricher, sculpted by André-Joseph Allar.

Public collections
 Marseille,  Museum of Fine Arts :
 The Ball Player, 1859, bronze statuette.
 The Spinning Top Player, 1860, bronze statuette.
 Daphnis et Chloé, 1875, marble group.
 Portrait of the Artist's Wife, 1893, marble bust.
 Young girl with a needle, marble.

Gallery

Bibliography
 .
 .

References

1831 births
19th-century births
1907 deaths
20th-century deaths
People from Var (department)